

A pulpulak is a public water fountain common in Armenia and Armenian-populated Nagorno-Karabakh Republic. Pulpulaks are a significant part of the Armenian culture. First pulpulaks appeared in the streets of Yerevan in 1920s and over time became extremely popular. Pulpulaks were and are often used by people to appoint meetings and by couples as dating locations.

Name 
The word pulpulak is colloquial and derives from the sound of the murmuring of water "pul-pul", suffixed with "ak" (ակ), meaning "water source". They are rarely referred to as tsaytaghbyur, meaning "squirt spring".

Description 
Pulpulaks are small, usually one meter tall, stone memorials with running water, often fed by a mountain spring. Some pulpulaks are erected in memory of dead relatives. In drinking from a memorial pulpulak, passers by give their blessing to the person in memory of whom it is constructed. Memorial pulpulaks are related to khatchkars.

Yotnaghbyur
Yotnaghbyur (Յոթնաղբյուր, meaning "seven springs") is the name of the famous pulpulak in Armenian capital Yerevan's Republic Square. It was erected by Spartak Gndeghtsyan in 1965. The fountain was restored in 2008 by Moscow-based Armenian designer Nur.

Gallery

See also 

Khatchkars
Armenian architecture

References 

Drinking fountains
Architecture in Armenia